The Dagur, Daghur, Dahur, or Daur language, is a Mongolic language, as well as a distinct branch of the Mongolic language family, and is primarily spoken by members of the Dagur ethnic group.

Distribution
Dagur is a Mongolic language consisting of four dialects:
Amur Dagur in the vicinity of Heihe (original homeland). About 400 people.
Nonni Dagur on the west side of the Nonni River from south of Qiqihar up to Morin Dawa Daur Autonomous Banner. Speakers of Nonni Dagur are usually grouped into the following 4 dialects:
Morin Daba Dagur, in Morin Dawa Daur Autonomous Banner (Moli Daba) of Hulun Buir League, Inner Mongolia
Butha (Buteha) (Northern) Dagur, immediately south of Morin Dawa Daur Autonomous Banner
Tsitsikar (Southern) Dagur, in Tsitsikar (Qiqihar) City and surrounding areas
Mergen Dagur or Nenjiang Dagur, in Nenjiang County (formerly Mergen County) of Heilongjiang Province
Hailar Dagur to the south-east of Hailar in Ewenki Autonomous Banner
Sinkiang Dagur in Xinjiang in the vicinity of Tacheng

There is no written standard in use, although a Pinyin-based orthography has been devised; instead the Dagur make use of Mongolian or Chinese, as most speakers know these languages as well. During the time of the Qing dynasty, Dagur was written with the Manchu alphabet.

Phonology

Dagur phonology is peculiar in that some of its dialects have developed a set of labialized consonants (e.g. 'flea' vs.  'moon'), while it shares palatalized consonants  with most Mongolian dialects that have not been developed in the other Mongolic languages. It also has , which is, however, limited to loan words. Word-final short vowels were lost and historically short vowels in non-initial syllables have lost phoneme status. Dagur is the only Mongolic language to share this development with Mongolian (i.e. Mongolian proper, Oirat, Buryat). According to Tsumagari (2003), vowel harmony is still a productive synchronic phonotactic aspect of Dagur in which initial syllable long vowels are divided into "masculine" (back), "feminine" (front), and neutral groups. Likewise, suffixal long vowels must agree in harmonic group with the root.

Vowels

{| class="wikitable" style="text-align: center;"
|+ Dagur vowels (Chuluu 1994)
! rowspan="2" |
! colspan="2" |Front
! colspan="2" |Central
! colspan="2"|Back
|-
! short
! long
!short
!long
! short
! long
|-
! style="text-align: left;" | Close
|
|
|
|
| 
| 
|-
! style="text-align: left;" | Mid
| 
| 
|
|
|
|
|-
! style="text-align: left;" | Open
|
|
|
|
|
|
|}

Consonants

Grammar

Dagur has a pronominal system that distinguishes between first person plural inclusive  and exclusive  and, even more archaic, it distinguishes between third person singular  and plural . While the phoneme  (< ) has been retained, the second person singular pronoun has become  nevertheless, resembling a more thorough sound change in Khorchin Mongolian. The genitive and accusative have fused in some variants, becoming –ji, and the ablative may assume the form of the instrumental case. The old comitative has been lost, while the innovated comitative is the same as in Mongolian. In addition, several other cases have been innovated that are not shared by Mongolian, including a new allative, -maji.

Dagur has a fairly simple tense-aspect system consisting of the nonpast markers - and (marginally) - and the past forms - and (marginally)  and the non-finite imperfective marker --. These may be inflected for person. The attributive particle forms are limited to – (< Written Mongolian -γ-a) for imperfective aspect and future tense, -sən (< -γsan) for perfective aspect, - (< -gči) for habituality (instead of -daγ which used to fulfil this function) and - for potential and probable actions. It has acquired a highly complex converbal system containing several innovations. Notably, -mar which is a participle in Mongolian serves as a converb as well.

Table of personal pronouns

Lexicon
It is estimated that out of Dagur's entire language vocabulary, over half is Mongolic in origin. Additionally, while Dagur has over 50% common Mongolic vocabulary, it has borrowed 5 to 10% of its words from Chinese, as well as 10% of its words from Manchu, and a small number vocabulary borrowed from Evenki and Russian – leaving about 20% vocabulary that is specific to Dagur only.

Middle Mongol words 
Dagur retains quite a few archaic Mongolic words, and although they are not commonly found in the modern Mongolic languages, they do appear in Middle Mongol sources, like the Hua-Yi yiyu and the ‘Secret History’. These words include:

  ‘road’ (in Mongol *jam)
  ‘summer’ (Mongol *jun)
  ‘head’ (Mongol *tologai)
  ‘staff’ (Mongol *tayag)
  ‘iron’
  ‘spade’
  ‘brain’
  ‘kidney’
  ‘knee’
  ‘salt’
  ‘clothes’
  ‘to say’ (cf. Mongol *kele-)

Numerals

All basic numerals are of Mongolic origin.

Notes

Bibliography
 
 Engkebatu (2001): Cing ulus-un üy-e-dü dagur kele-ber bicigdegsen jokiyal-ud-un sudulul. Kökeqota: Öbür monggol-un yeke surgaguli-yin keblel-ün qoriy-a.
 
 
 Sengge (2004): Daγur kele. In: Oyunčimeg 2004: 616-617.
 Sengge (2004a): Daγur kelen-ü abiy-a. In: Oyunčimeg 2004: 618.
 Sengge (2004b): Daγur kelen-ü üges. In: Oyunčimeg 2004: 619.
 Sengge (2004c): Daγur kelen-ü kele ǰüi. In: Oyunčimeg 2004: 618-622.
 Tsumagari, Toshiro (2003): Dagur. In: Janhunen, Juha (ed.) (2003): The Mongolic languages. London: Routledge: 129-153.
 Yu, Wonsoo, Jae-il Kwon, Moon-Jeong Choi, Yong-kwon Shin, Borjigin Bayarmend, Luvsandorj[in] Bold (2008): A study of the Tacheng dialect of the Dagur language. Seoul: Seoul National University Press.

External links
Unicode Manchu/Sibe/Dagur Fonts and Keyboards
Learning Dagur (in Chinese)

Agglutinative languages
Mongolic languages
Languages of China